UniCOLT is a family of 4x4 military logistical vehicles manufactured by the Sri Lanka Electrical and Mechanical Engineers for use by the Sri Lankan Armed Forces.

Design 
UniCOLT is almost entire locally manufactured with Sri Lankan made parts except for their engines and chassis and comes in multiple variants for different roles . They are equipped with Air Conditioned Cabins, Audio system with reverse camera, GPS Tracking and Engine overheating sensors.

Variants 

 UniCOLT MPT: Multi Purpose Truck variant 
 UniCOLT GE:  Diesel Gully Emptier with 5000 litre capacity
 UniCOLT WB:  Water Bowser variant with a tank capacity of 8000 litres

References

Post–Cold War military equipment of Sri Lanka
Military trucks
Vehicles of Sri Lanka
Military vehicles introduced in the 2020s